The Kostroma Oblast Duma is the regional parliament of Kostroma Oblast, a federal subject of Russia. A total of 35 deputies are elected for five-year terms.

Elections

2005

2010

2015

2020

References

Kostroma Oblast
Politics of Kostroma Oblast